Give It to God is the 23rd and final studio album by Della Reese, released on September 23, 2006. The album consists of gospel music.

Track listing

References

Della Reese albums
2006 albums
Gospel albums by American artists